Lemes may refer to:
Lemes (surname)
Lemeš (disambiguation)